Henry Lowndes Muldrow (February 8, 1837March 1, 1905) was an American politician who served as the First Assistant Secretary of the Interior in the first Cleveland administration. Prior to this he served as U.S. Representative from Mississippi's 1st congressional district, a member of the Mississippi House of Representatives and as an officer of the Confederate States Army who commanded a cavalry regiment in the Western Theater of the American Civil War. He was "Grand Cyclops" of the Oktibbeha County Ku Klux Klan den.

Early life and education 
Muldrow was born in Lowndes County, Mississippi, on February 8, 1837, the sixth child of Simon Connell (1809–1868) and Louisa Adaline (née Cannon; 1798–1853) Muldrow. He graduated from the University of Mississippi in 1858. The next year he graduated from the law school of the same university; being admitted to the bar and commenced practice in Starkville in the year after. He was appointed second lieutenant in Company C, 14th Mississippi Infantry Regiment in 1861; later attaining the rank of lieutenant-colonel in the 11th Mississippi Cavalry Regiment. Afterwards he served as the attorney for the sixth judicial district of Mississippi and became a member of the Mississippi House of Representatives in 1875. While serving as the attorney for the sixth district, he was a member of the Oktibbeha County Ku Klux Klan den, serving as its "Grand Cyclops". As author Michael Newton points out, "Three dens terrorized Oktibbeha County, led (and defended in court when need be) by Henry Muldrow". Oktibbeah County voters sent Ku Klux leader Henry Muldrow to the state legislature "as a check upon the ignorant negroes in that body". Muldrow won his seat, in part thanks to the intimidation of black voters via threats of violence. Muldrow is also noted, among others, for his public oratory which "persuaded most white Democrats that Klansmen were their champions in a life-or-death struggle to preserve southern society". From 1876 to 1898 he was a trustee of his alma mater.

Political career 
Muldrow was elected as a Democrat to the Forty-fifth and to the three succeeding Congresses (March 4, 1877 – March 3, 1885). He also served as Chairman, Committee on Territories (Forty-sixth Congress), and on the Committee on Private Land Claims (Forty-eighth Congress). He also helped to introduce a bill that proposed that the U.S. change to use a modified version of the metric system for coinage. During the first administration of President Grover Cleveland he was appointed to the office of First Assistant Secretary of the Interior. He resigned in 1889 and resumed his law practice. Muldrow was also a delegate to the Mississippi Constitutional Convention of 1890. As Newton points out, "The convention's final product, imposed on Mississippi without a popular vote, established a two-dollar poll tax, mandated two years' residency in the state and one year in the would-be voter's district, and denied ballots to convicted felons or tax-defaulters. Section 244 further required that any voter must "be able to read any section of the constitution of this State; or he shall be able to understand the same when read to him, or give a reasonable interpretation thereof." The net effect, by 1892, was to remove 138,400 blacks and 52,000 whites from the state's electoral rolls." The official constitutional record of the 1890 convention reads that "It is the manifest intention of this Convention to secure to the State of Mississippi 'white supremacy". Muldrow was appointed chancellor of the first district of Mississippi in September 1899; serving until 1905. He died on March 1, 1905.

Honors 
Muldrow, Oklahoma, and Colonel Muldrow Avenue in Starkville, Mississippi, are named after him.

See also 
 List of Delta Tau Delta members
 List of people from Mississippi
 List of United States representatives from Mississippi
 List of University of Mississippi alumni

References

External links 

 
 Henry L. Muldrow at The Political Graveyard

1837 births
1905 deaths
11th Mississippi Cavalry Regiment
19th-century American lawyers
19th-century American politicians
American bank presidents
American Civil War prisoners of war
American people of Scotch-Irish descent
American Presbyterians
Burials in Mississippi
Cavalry commanders
Cleveland administration personnel
Deaths from organ failure
Delta Tau Delta
Democratic Party members of the United States House of Representatives from Mississippi
Farmers from Mississippi
Democratic Party members of the Mississippi House of Representatives
Mississippi lawyers
People from Lowndes County, Mississippi
People of Mississippi in the American Civil War
United States Assistant Secretaries of the Interior
University of Mississippi alumni
University of Mississippi School of Law alumni